The Man Who Laughs is a romantic novel by Victor Hugo originally published in June 1869 under the French title L'homme qui rit.

The Man Who Laughs may also refer to:

Films
 The Man Who Laughs, a 1909 lost film made in France; see 1909 in film
 The Grinning Face, a 1921 Austrian-German silent horror film, also known as The Man Who Laughs
 The Man Who Laughs (1928 film), an American silent film
 The Man Who Laughs (1966 film) (L'uomo che ride), an Italian-French film directed by Sergio Corbucci
 L'homme qui rit, a 1971 TV movie directed by Jean Kerchbron and starring Xavier Depraz as Ursus
 The Man Who Laughs (2012 film), a French film

Other
 Batman: The Man Who Laughs, a 2005 graphic novel
 "The Man Who Laughs", a song by Rob Zombie from the 2010 album Hellbilly Deluxe 2